La Molina is a district of the Lima Province in Peru, and one of the upscale districts that comprise the province of Lima. Officially established as a district on February 6, 1962, the current mayor of La Molina is Álvaro Paz de la Barra.

Geography
The district has a total land area of 65.75 km². Its administrative centre is located 241 metres above sea level.

La Molina is located between 12° 00' 07" S, 76° 57' 00" and 76° 51' 00" W.

Boundaries
 North: Ate Vitarte
 East: Cieneguilla and Pachacámac
 South: Villa María del Triunfo and San Juan de Miraflores
 West: Santiago de Surco

Demographics
According to the 2017 census by the INEI, the district has 140,679 inhabitants and a population density of 2,100 persons/km². Annual median income varies greatly.

History

Name
There are two possible origins, both referring to the owners of the estates located in the area in the Peruvian Republican era. 
 Captain Nicolás Flores de Molina, owner of La Molina estate.
 Melchor Malo de Molina, Marquis de Monterrico, owner of Monterrico Grande estate.

Creation
In the years before its creation, the estates located in the geographic area of the district (Granados, Melgarejo, La Rinconada, Camacho and La Molina) had been already sold (or expropriated by the Juan Velasco Alvarado administration) and divided, giving origin to smaller yet large properties. Soon, due to the quiet and beautiful surroundings, owning country houses in La Molina became a trend for high class people. This resulted in the populating of the first neighbourhoods via individuals with high incomes. Finally, on February 6, 1962, La Molina district was officially created, and the new district was segregated from the old Ate Vitarte district, by Act No. 13981 during the Manuel Prado Ugarteche government.

Philanthropy
Some members of the community are active members in "Un techo para mi pais" which helps people in need build houses. This organization is similar to the international organization Habitat for Humanity.

District Structure
La Molina is a residential district, largely high class, in which the urbanizations La Planicie, El Sol de La Molina, Rinconada, La Molina Vieja, Club Campestre Las Lagunas, Camacho, Santa Patricia and Las Viñas stand out. La Molina is identified as one of the districts where there is no extreme poverty.

La Molina has six large clearly identified sectors:

Camacho is an area located to the west of the district, in which exclusive family houses are located. It is made up of the urbanizations of Camacho; which is frequented by residents of the same district for its striking shopping centers, Santa Sofía Magdalena, the La Fontana urbanization, part of Cerros de Camacho (shared with Groove), the Monterrico Residential and the human settlement "Matazango". This area borders the Surco district (Monterrico) and the Ate Vitarte district (Salamanca). It is crossed by Las Palmeras Avenue, Javier Prado Avenue and Los Frutales Avenue. It makes up 15% of the district.
La Molina Vieja is the southern part of the district. In La Molina Vieja there are exclusive houses that are located in the urbanizations La Molina Vieja, La Alameda de la Molina Vieja, Los Sirius and El Remanso, Corregidor, here you can also find the Faculty of Law and Medicine of the San Martin de Porres University. There are also the Isla del Sol, Las Viñas de La Molina, Portada del Sol, La Capilla (Pro-Housing Association Vemtracom Association), La Molina Valley and Las Lomas de la Molina Vieja urbanizations. These make up 20% of the district.
Santa Patricia is located north of the district, borders the district of Ate (Mayorazgo) and is inhabited mostly by middle-class sectors in high density. It is made up of the quadrant between La Molina Avenue, Melgarejo Avenue, Industrial Separator Avenue and La Universidad Avenue, and includes urbanizations such as Covima and Santa Raquel. It is the largest area of the district. In this one there are centers of higher studies, among them: San Ignacio de Loyola, and Instituto San Ignacio de Loyola. As well as renowned private schools: Jean le Boulch, Antonio Raimondi, Our Lady of Guide, Virgin of the Rosary of Yungay, and Bruning, among others. Although it is a residential area, it also develops trade in avenues such as Melgarejo, Los Constructores, Flora Tristán and Javier Prado, especially in regards to restaurants. It is the most visually picturesque urbanization, since important architectural works are found there, such as the Lima Peru Temple of the Church of Jesus Christ of Latter-day Saints (made entirely of white marble) and the main headquarters of the Banco de Crédito del Perú, which is built on a reforested hill.
The Agrarian University La Molina is located in the middle of the district. Due to this university and its large green areas, La Molina is considered an ecological district. Aso in this area are the human settlement "Las Hormigas" and the School "IE 1207 Sagrado Corazón De Jesús".
Rinconada Alta, Rinconada Baja, Rinconada del Lago, La Planicie, El Sol de La Molina, Huertos de La Molina and Club Campestre Las Lagunas. These urbanizations are inhabited by high class people, but the population density is very low. This sector begins in Molicentro and is crossed by La Molina Avenue and Elías Aparicio Avenue. It forms 20% of the district. Within the Club Campestre Las Lagunas urbanization there are two artificial lagoons called Laguna Chica and Laguna Grande. You cannot enter the Laguna Chica because it is surrounded by houses, but you can enter the Laguna Grande. This is a publicly accessible space. It also has an island where meetings are held.
Musa is located in the east of the district. It is a "popular" urbanization of middle and lower middle class, it was formed by the workers' association of the La Molina National Agrarian University, SIPA, the Municipality of La Molina and La Arenera. It is located in Squares 46 and 47 of Avenida La Molina or Carretera a Cieneguilla km 10.5, both blocks cross the Jirón Madreselva, whose street belongs to the Musa urbanization, and it is divided into 5 stages. And ends the district with the "Municipal Deposit". This urbanization is also accompanied by areas such as "Las Flores de La Molina", "Los Arbolitos" and  "Espalda del Minicomplejo". There is also the CNMx School. 1220 "San José Marello", the "César Vidaurre Reina Farje Municipal Sports Complex", the Musa Cooperative Market, the Depincri La Molina - Cieneguilla and the "Municipal Stadium of La Molina". It is estimated that Musa and its surroundings make up approximately 5% of the district, and it borders the District of Pachacámac (Block 48 De La Av. La Molina / "Paradero Los Sauces" and Arenera La Molina).

La Molina is a district with a profusion of large constructions. For the same reason, several important exclusive Peruvian social clubs have their headquarters in this district, among them:

La Rinconada Country Club

La Planicie Country Club

It is the district of Lima with the highest density of green areas, reaching up to 20 m² (square meters) for each inhabitant. In the south of La Molina, on the slopes of the San Pedro, Media Luna and San Francisco hills is the La Molina Ecological Park, which houses 208.6 ha (hectares), and was established on May 12, 2004. Already It has been arborizing with certain species of trees and plants for which sowing campaigns are carried out from time to time. This will be the largest ecological park in Lima. It has more than 13,000 plants between trees and shrubs.

It also houses important private cemeteries, such as La Planicie Cemetery and Jardines de la Paz Cemetery Park.

Municipal government
The current structure of municipal government is such that an elected mayor is head of municipal government with 11 elected aldermen or alderwomen. They provide counsel and vote on important municipal matters. The mayor is elected to a four-year term, as are the alder persons. Currently, there is no restriction on their ability to run for elected office again except that current office holders may not run in consecutive periods. This means that any current elected official in La Molina must wait at least four years after the end of their tenure before attempting to run again for any office.

Additionally, various projects are assigned with project managers and commissions may be established with managers depending upon the needs of the city. Meetings are held regularly, and citizens may provide input.

Urban distribution
La Molina district is divided into middle, middle-high and upper class suburbs.

Upper class suburbs
La Molina is best known for the large and luxurious houses that give shape to expensive properties located in suburbs like La Planicie, Rinconada, Las Lagunas, Camacho, Residential Monterrico, La Molina Vieja, Alameda de la Molina Vieja, Los Sirius, Corregidor, El Remanso and Huertos de La Molina. Numerous Peruvian celebrities, leading business people and political figures live in these suburbs. Due to their relative safety, calm and low population density, these suburbs are highly valued real estate.

Middle and upper middle class suburbs
Santa Felicia, Santa Raquel, Covima, Santa Patricia, La Ensenada, La Capilla, Las Acacias, Las Lomas, Los Ingenieros, Pablo Bonner, Pablo Cánepa, La Fontana and Farwest compose the high class area in the district. They compose the largest part of the district.  Some suburbs (Santa Patricia, Santa Felicia, Santa Raquel and Covima) used to belong to the neighbouring district of Ate, but they were won over by La Molina. The process was led by the desire of the residents.

Musa is a curious case, because it is a middle class urbanization with a medium population density but it has many sectors of the lower middle class because the construction of its houses was carried out by the relatives of the neighbors since its foundation in the late 1960s. However, modern houses with up to three floors are now available, obviously after they have managed to improve the aesthetics of their properties over time. Currently the houses and apartments are more expensive than before, and today, their neighbors are descendants of the founding workers of the urbanization and it has improved a lot. Throughout the years it has thus become a very safe place to live. In recent years a new area was created in this urbanization and it is the human settlement "San Juan Bautista".  This last area is an invasion product of the Manchay area, the Pachacámac district, and is located on the top of the hill of Musa - this part being the most vulnerable of the entire urbanization because here the houses are made of plywood.

Urban development
Modern enterprise buildings, shopping malls and private universities are found in La Molina. An intense urbanizing process has turned La Molina into an example of development and progress for the country.

On Av. Raul Ferrero is located the principal mall of the district, called "Molina Plaza", one of the most important commercial centres of Lima. This mall helped the commercial evolution of this important avenue where nowadays are found premium restaurants, bars and boutiques.

In education, many of the upper class private schools in Lima are located in La Molina, including Newton College, Colegio Waldorf-Lima, Frankin D. Roosevelt School, Peruvian North American Abraham Lincoln School, Colegio Alpamayo, Colegio Antonio Raimondi, Reina de los Ángeles School, Villa Caritas, San Pedro School, Peruvian-German School Reina del Mundo, Colegio Domingo Faustino Sarmiento, Lord Byron School, Colegio Altair, La Molina Christian Schools, etc. Several universities are located in La Molina as well, including Universidad Nacional Agraria La Molina, Universidad San Ignacio de Loyola, Universidad Femenina del Sagrado Corazón (UNIFE) and Universidad de San Martín de Porres.

Transport
Transportation in La Molina is complicated for several reasons. One of them is the existing traffic on the most important avenues. This is due to the huge number of vehicles that residents of the most exclusive areas of the entire district have. This creates a circulatory chaos in the mornings from 7:00 a.m. m. to 9:00 a.m. m. and in the evenings from 7:00 p. m. at 9:00 p.m. Another problem in the district is public transportation. In the most difficult to access sectors such as Las Lomas, La Planicie and La Laguna, public transport is almost non-existent. For this reason, there is not a huge number of taxis or buses. On the other hand, on routes that pass through the entire Avenida La Molina that lead to Musa, public transport tends to be massive, because many "Couster", "combis" or "buses" go to Cieneguilla or have as their main destination "Manchay", Pachacámac District. For this route to Musa there is also the corridor service "204" (it passes and ends all of "Avenida La Molina").  At the end of passing the area of "Molicentro" towards El Sol de La Molina, transport is usually more fluid and quiet because it passes through residential areas, so it makes the avenue become very desolate, relaxed and without noise. There is never traffic congestion or stops here until reaching the Municipal Deposit and the Arenera (Limit with Pachacámac).

In more "central" areas such as Santa Patricia and Santa Felicia, which cross main avenues such as Javier Prado and Constructores, transport is not usually so simple. In the latter there is the corridor service "209" (it goes through Av . Constructores) and "201" (passes through Av. Javier Prado Este). One of the reasons why transportation is complicated are the morning and night schedules, since the service inside the buses becomes very full due to the immense number of passengers and because many of these people come from the district by Ate Vitarte. Even so, the traffic in the "Javier Prado" is usually very frequent, as is the immense vehicular congestion and stops in Santa Patricia.

To all this is added the few exits that the district has, one along Avenida Raúl Ferrero going down the Cerro Centinela towards the Monterrico Sur area and another through Avenida Javier Prado. For several years it has been ready for execution, including within the Metropolitan Development Plan, the construction of the expansion of Los Cóndores Avenue connection with Los Álamos - Angamos Avenue. For this route there is the corridor service "206" (passes through Av. Corregidor)

Line 4 of the Lima Metro is also expected to enter the district through Javier Prado Avenue, linking it with Jorge Chávez International Airport.

See also 
 Administrative divisions of Peru

References

External links

 Portal de la Municipalidad de La Molina - La Molina Municipal Council official portal
https://larepublica.pe/politica/1333369-molina-alvaro-paz-barra-virtual-alcalde-boca-urna-ipsos-elecciones-municipales-2018
Catholic Churches - Mass Services
http://www.arzobispadodelima.org/horarios-de-misa-en-lima/horarios-de-misa-en-parroquias/la-molina/

Districts of Lima